The Joshua Davis House (also known as the Old Bates House or Thomas Dawsey Cabin or Old Stagecoach Stop) is a historic home in Mt. Pleasant, Florida. It is located two-and-a-half miles northwest of Mt. Pleasant on U.S. 90. On May 21, 1975, it was added to the U.S. National Register of Historic Places.

References

External links
 Gadsden County listings at National Register of Historic Places
 Florida's Office of Cultural and Historical Programs
 Gadsden County listings
 Gadsden County markers

Houses in Gadsden County, Florida
Houses on the National Register of Historic Places in Florida
National Register of Historic Places in Gadsden County, Florida
Houses completed in 1824
1824 establishments in Florida Territory